The Imperial Register was a list of the Imperial Estates of the Holy Roman Empire that specified the precise numbers of troops they had to supply to the Imperial Army and/or the financial support they had to make available to sustain the Army. An entry in the register was often viewed as an important indicator of the imperial immediacy of an imperial estate, although that was not always undisputed. The importance of the register for historical research is that all Estates were recorded in it. However, it also contains obvious errors.

The term Matrikel is derived from the Latin word mātrīcula, a diminutive of mātrīx ("list", "register").

Literature

References

Sources 

Military history of the Holy Roman Empire
Military history of Germany
Army of the Holy Roman Empire
Index (publishing)